Hengnania is an extinct genus of prehistoric ray-finned fish.

References

External links
 Bony fish in the online Sepkoski Database
 

Prehistoric teleostei
Prehistoric ray-finned fish genera